Johannes François Adriaan Cateau van Rosevelt (7 September 1824 – 20 October 1891) was a Dutch navy officer and civil servant in Suriname where he was, among other things, agent-general for immigration and a member of the Colonial Estates of Suriname. He is known for his map of Suriname.

Family 
In 1870 he married the former slave Josephina Leentje Haver (1832-1906), with whom he had six premarital children and who had obtained a manumission from her owner A.M. Brandon in 1849.

Career 
In 1841, Cateau van Rosevelt first arrived in Suriname as ordinary seaman. On 9 January 1845, he returned as warrant officer. He worked as post commander in Commewijne and Nickerie, and studied mathematics and engineering. During that period, he started to create a map of Suriname. Even though he had been promoted officer, he left the navy in 1861.

Between 1868 and 1871, Cateau van Rosevelt was District Commissioner for Lower and Upper Saramacca. He was elected member of the Colonial States in 1873, and served until his death.

In 1872, Cateau van Rosevelt was appointed the first agent general for immigration. In that position, he oversaw the immigration of contract workers and mediated in labour disputes. He received the first Indo-Surinamese immigrants, who disembarked on 5 June 1873. In 1881, the first version of his map of Suriname was published. The map was bought by the Suriname government, expanded and corrected, and in 1912 became the official map of the colony.

In 1891, Cateau van Rosevelt intended to retire in the Netherlands, however the Governor van Asch van Wijck asked him to stay until his successor had been appointed and installed. Cateau van Rosevelt died on 20 October 1891 in Paramaribo, at the age of 67.

The Rosevelt peak in the interior of Suriname is named after him.

Map 
The map of Suriname of 1880.

Sources 
 C.F.A. Bruijning en J. Voorhoeve (red.), Encyclopedie van Suriname, Amsterdam/Brussel 1977, .
 L. Lapikás, Fragment Genealogie Cateau van Rosevelt, version 1.1, Muiden, 2012

References 

Explorers of South America
19th-century Surinamese people
1824 births
1891 deaths
Royal Netherlands Navy officers
People from Hattem
Surinamese politicians
Members of the National Assembly (Suriname)
Dutch cartographers
19th-century cartographers